Philip MacCann is a British author.

Born in Manchester, he was educated at Trinity College, Dublin and studied creative writing at the University of East Anglia under Malcolm Bradbury. His first book, The Miracle Shed (1995), a collection of short stories, won the Rooney Prize for Irish Literature, and in 2000 he was awarded the Shiva Naipaul Memorial Prize.

In the 1990s he was a literary journalist for the Guardian newspaper and the Spectator magazine and contributed frequently to Prospect Magazine and others. It was here that he made public a distinct classical aesthetic, statements about the ethical shortcomings of Art and he became known for his acerbic criticism of consumer capitalism. Even before the Miracle Shed was published he wrote in The Guardian of his reluctance to continue publishing literary art in what was much more than a populist climate: a culture oppressed and vandalized by the abuse of corporate power. His first short stories appeared in Faber's First Fictions, the New Yorker and New Writing 1 and 3 (Minerva/British Council). Criticising the writing of the day as "becalmed writing from a stagnant pool", The Guardian singled out MacCann for special praise: "Really blazes - this is what Literature is about."

In 1999 The Observer newspaper selected him as one of twenty world authors expected to be important in the new millennium. But in fact, only a handful of stories subsequently appeared: in Granta magazine, the Faber Book of Best New Irish Short Stories, The Dublin Review and The Irish Times. He has shown little interest in publishing since 1995, has had no public profile and could not be contacted over the creation of this site. His one small book continues to be praised and his silence still inspires some degree of curiosity on the Internet.

The Miracle Shed
The stories were described by one reviewer as having "the nervous, risky feel of someone doodling with razor blades", with technical innovations and the strangeness of the imagery aiming for "aesthetic ecstasy". "MacCann's risky use of language, his weirdly beautiful style, inspires optimism, lifting the spirit as great art does. He's an immensely talented and original writer," wrote Time Out magazine. Black humour and at times over-rich language aim to seduce readers into enjoying tales of intense suffering, an effect which is perhaps meant to mirror how characters are tempted by guilty joys.

Themes
One explanatory phrase appearing on the cover of the first edition is "spiritual despair", which perhaps explains the ruthlessness and strangeness of Nature, its inappropriateness for human sensitivity and the ease with which evil is perpetrated even in intimate relationships (between dysfunctional lovers or with oppressive parents). One hallmark of the style is how scenes are dramatized with cold detachment and without authorial comment, assisting the realism. A recurring motif in these and later stories highlights the plight of a very young couple struggling to cope with pregnancy. The vision shares with some American Catholic literature and some strands of Feminism a brutal vision of male sexuality. Other themes include: sexual rage, violence, frustration and taboos; poverty, prostitution and abuse; psychedelia; transcendentalism, magic and the occult.

Awards and honours
1995 Rooney Prize for Irish Literature
2000 Shiva Naipaul Memorial Prize

References

1966 births
Alumni of Trinity College Dublin
Alumni of the University of East Anglia
Writers from Manchester
20th-century British writers
21st-century British writers
20th-century writers from Northern Ireland
21st-century writers from Northern Ireland
20th-century Irish writers
21st-century Irish writers
21st-century Irish male writers
Living people